Agin-Buryat Autonomous Okrug was a federal subject of the Russian Federation. On 1 March 2008, the region merged with Chita Oblast (which it was surrounded by) to form the new Zabaykalsky Krai. The territory of the former ABAO is now the Agin-Buryat Okrug of Zabaykalsky Krai, in which it has a special status.

History

Soviet Union 
The district was first created in its modern form on 26 September 1937 as the Agin Buryat-Mongol National Okrug within Chita Oblast. Following the change of the ethnonym "Buryat-Mongol" to "Buryat" on 16 September 1958, the region was renamed to Agin-Buryat National Okrug, and became the Agin-Buryat Autonomous Okrug" on 7 October 1977.

Russian Federation 
From 31 March 1992, the district was both an independent federal subject of Russia and a part of Chita Oblast until it was abolished on 1 March 2008.

Merging with Chita Oblast 
Work on merging the region with Chita Oblast began in April 2006. The authorities of both regions sent a letter to president Vladimir Putin who supported this initiative to merge the two regions. The merger referendum was held on 11 March 2007.

In Agin-Buryat Autonomous Okrug, 94% (38,814 people) supported the merger, 5.16% (2,129 people) were against. 82.95% of the population of the autonomous okrug took part in the referendum.

In Chita Oblast, 90.29% (535,045 people) supported the merger, 8.89% (52,698 people) were against. 72.82% of the population of the oblast took part in the referendum.

As a result of the majority of voters in both regions supporting the unification of the two regions, Zabaykalsky Krai was formed on 1 March 2008.

Administrative divisions 
The autonomous okrug had three districts:
 Aginsky District
 Duldurginsky District
 Mogoytuysky District

References

External links
 Official site

Autonomous okrugs of Russia
1977 establishments in the Soviet Union
Russian-speaking countries and territories
Former federal subjects of Russia